Wilf Pearson was a professional rugby league footballer who played in the 1930s and 1940s. He played at club level for Featherstone Rovers (captain) (Heritage № 154).

Playing career
Pearson made his début for Featherstone Rovers on Saturday 2 October 1937.

County Cup Final appearances
Pearson played left-, i.e. number 11, in Featherstone Rovers' 12-9 victory over Wakefield Trinity in the 1939–40 Yorkshire County Cup Final during the 1939–40 season at Odsal Stadium, Bradford on Saturday 22 June 1940.

Testimonial match
Pearson's benefit season at Featherstone Rovers took place during the 1940–41 season.

References

External links

Search for "Pearson" at rugbyleagueproject.org

English rugby league players
Featherstone Rovers captains
Featherstone Rovers players
Place of birth missing
Place of death missing
Year of birth missing
Year of death missing
Rugby league second-rows